Accident and Emergency is a department in a medical facility that specializes in the acute care of patients without any prior appointments.

Accident and Emergency may also refer to:  
"A&E" (song), a song performed by British duo Goldfrapp
"Accident & Emergency" (song), a single by English singer-songwriter Patrick Wolf on the album The Magic Position
 Accident & Emergency, a 1997 album by These Animal Men
A+E (album), a 2012 album by Graham Coxon